Hallberg's cloud forest snake (Cryophis hallbergi) is a genus of snake in the family Colubridae that is monotypic in the genus Cryophis.

It is endemic to Mexico, where it occurs in the Sierra Juarez and Sierra Mazateca of northern Oaxaca state from 1,200 to 1,865 meters elevation.

References 

Dipsadinae
Monotypic snake genera
Endemic reptiles of Mexico
Fauna of the Sierra Madre de Oaxaca
Taxa named by William Edward Duellman
Reptiles described in 1963